Citizens for Responsibility and Ethics in Washington v. Trump was a case brought before the United States District Court for the Southern District of New York. The plaintiffs, watchdog group Citizens for Responsibility and Ethics in Washington (CREW), hotel and restaurant owner Eric Goode, an association of restaurants known as ROC United, and an Embassy Row hotel event booker named Jill Phaneuf alleged that the defendant, President Donald Trump, was in violation of the Foreign Emoluments Clause, a constitutional provision that bars the president or any other federal official from taking gifts or payments from foreign governments. CREW filed its complaint on January 23, 2017, shortly after Trump was inaugurated as president. An amended complaint, adding the hotel and restaurant industry plaintiffs, was filed on April 18, 2017. A second amended complaint was filed on May 10, 2017. CREW was represented by several prominent lawyers and legal scholars in the case.

U.S. District Judge George B. Daniels dismissed the case on December 21, 2017, holding that plaintiffs lacked standing. On appeal, the U.S. Court of Appeals for the Second Circuit reversed the dismissal, reinstated the suit, and remanded the case to the district court for further proceedings. In January 2021, the U.S. Supreme Court instructed the lower courts to dismiss the case (and a similar case brought by Maryland and the District of Columbia) as moot, because Trump was no longer president.

Background
Citizens for Responsibility and Ethics in Washington stated that because Trump-owned buildings take in rent, room rentals and other payments from foreign governments, the president has breached the Foreign Emoluments Clause. The Constitution says that "no Person holding any Office of Profit or Trust under the United States, shall, without the Consent of the Congress, accept of any present, Emolument, Office, or Title, of any kind whatever, from any King, Prince, or foreign State." The case also includes a claim under the Domestic Emoluments Clause.

An Emoluments Clause lawsuit directed at a sitting president has never been tested in court, and there is little judicial precedent in this area of constitutional law. The Clause is, however, the subject of a considerable body of precedent from the Justice Department's Office of Legal Counsel and the Office of the Comptroller General. The plaintiffs are asking for an injunction and declaratory judgment directed at President Trump requiring that he cease violations of the Emoluments Clauses. On January 23, 2017, after the action was filed in U.S. District Court, Trump rejected the arguments underlying the lawsuit as "Without merit," and "Totally without merit" during his morning press conference at the White House.

CREW is represented in the suit by "a group  former White House ethics lawyers, constitutional scholars, and Supreme Court litigators," including constitutional law professor Laurence H. Tribe of Harvard Law School; Supreme Court litigator Deepak Gupta of Gupta Wessler PLLC; Erwin Chemerinsky, the dean of the University of California, Berkeley School of Law; Richard Painter, law professor at the University of Minnesota and chief ethics lawyer in the George W. Bush administration; and Zephyr Teachout of Fordham Law School. The United States Department of Justice represents Trump.

Quotes from second amended complaint

District court proceedings
President Trump filed a motion to dismiss on June 9, 2017. on the grounds that the plaintiffs had no right to sue and that the described conduct was not illegal. A response to the motion to dismiss was filed on August 4, 2017, with a DOJ reply due by September 22, 2017. A full answer from DOJ lawyers to the facts alleged in the complaint was due on August 11, 2017.  Oral arguments were expected October 18, 2017.

On December 21, 2017, the motion to dismiss was granted; Judge George B. Daniels held that plaintiffs lacked standing.

Second Circuit proceedings
On February 16, 2018, the dismissal of the suit was appealed by CREW, primarily on an economically-informed theory of emolument-related injury to competitors, with all briefs filed by both parties by June 27. Deepak Gupta of Gupta Wessler presented oral argument for the plaintiffs before a three-judge panel of the Second Circuit on October 30, 2018.  On September 13, 2019, the U.S. Court of Appeals for the Second Circuit in New York (in a 2 to 1 decision) reinstated the lawsuit and sent it back to the lower court so that the case can move forward. The appellate decision was critical of the July 2019 appellate decision in D.C. and Maryland v. Trump.

In January 2021, the U.S. Supreme Court instructed the lower courts to dismiss the case (and a similar case brought by Maryland and the District of Columbia) as moot, because Trump was no longer president.

On April 23, 2021, the Second Circuit Court of Appeals issued a mandate which dismissed the case.

See also

 D.C. and Maryland v. Trump
 CREW and National Security Archive v. Trump and EOP
 Blumenthal v. Trump
 List of lawsuits involving Donald Trump
 Foreign Emoluments Clause, Article I, Section 9, Clause 8 of United States Constitution
 Domestic Emoluments Clause, Article II, Section 1, Clause 7 of United States Constitution

References

External links
 Copy of complaint filed in United States District Court (PDF, 37 pages, 271 KB)
 Copy of Second Amended Complaint filed in United States District Court (PDF, 68 pages, 407 KB)
 Copy of Memorandum in support of motion to Dismiss for Lack of Jurisdiction and for Failure to State a Claim (PDF, 70 pages, 687 KB)

Donald Trump litigation
United States District Court for the Southern District of New York cases
United States Constitution Article One case law 
United States Constitution Article Two case law 
United States standing case law
2017 in United States case law
United States Court of Appeals for the Second Circuit cases